Norman William Paton is a Professor in the Department of Computer Science at the University of Manchester in the UK where he co-leads the Information Management Group (IMG) with Carole Goble.

Education
Paton was educated at the University of Aberdeen where he was awarded first class Bachelor of Science degree in Computing Science in 1986 and a PhD in 1989 for research into object-oriented database systems using Prolog supervised by Peter Gray.

Research
Paton's research interests are currently in distributed information management including dataspaces, query processing in Wireless sensor networks, autonomic computing, workflow management, and data management for systems biology. His research has been funded by the EPSRC, the BBSRC and the European Union.

Paton has also been active in the Open Grid Forum (OGF), Proteomics Standards Initiative (PSI) and the Manchester Centre for Integrative Systems Biology (MCISB).

Teaching
Paton has taught on several database courses at undergraduates and postgraduate level.

Administration
Paton has had a variety of roles in the School of Computer Science including director of the research school, director of teaching strategy, and 
head of school from 
November 2008 
to November 2011.

References

Academics of the University of Manchester
People associated with the Department of Computer Science, University of Manchester
Living people
Year of birth missing (living people)